As of February 2023, there are 151 habitable buildings (used for living and working in, as opposed to masts and religious use) in the United Kingdom at least  tall, 118 of them in London, 13 in Manchester, six in Birmingham, three each in Leeds and Salford, two each in Liverpool and Woking, and one each in Brighton and Hove, Portsmouth, Sheffield and Swansea (the only such structure outside England).

The UK had not been noted historically for its abundance of skyscrapers, with the taller structures throughout the country tending to be cathedrals, church spires and industrial chimneys. In London for example, high-rise development was restricted at certain sites if it would obstruct protected views of St Paul's Cathedral and other historic buildings. This protective policy, known as 'St Paul’s Heights', had been in operation by the City of London since 1937. Despite this, since the early 21st century, the number of high-rise buildings in London has grown significantly.

The UK's tallest office buildings are all located in the City of London and the capital's secondary business district of Canary Wharf. The five tallest are 22 Bishopsgate (278 m), One Canada Square (235 m), 110 Bishopsgate (230 m), 122 Leadenhall Street (225 m) and 8 Bishopsgate (204 m). The five tallest residential buildings in the UK are London's Landmark Pinnacle (233 m), Newfoundland Quay (220 m), Valiant Tower (215 m), One Park Drive (205 m), and Manchester's Deansgate Square South Tower (201 m).

Other UK cities with emerging high-rise skylines or notable tall buildings include Leeds, Liverpool, Sheffield, Brighton and Hove, and Portsmouth, while several others including Cardiff, Glasgow and Milton Keynes are planning to construct tall buildings in the future.

Tallest existing buildings

Architectural height is considered, so masts and other elements added after the completion of the building are not considered.

Updated 30 January 2022

Buildings above 100m

Tallest buildings under construction

This includes spires and architectural details but does not include antenna masts.

Updated 30 January 2023

Tallest approved buildings

This includes spires and architectural details but does not include antenna masts.

Updated 30 January 2023

This includes spires and architectural details but does not include antenna masts.

Updated 29 December 2022

Tallest proposed buildings

This includes spires and architectural details but does not include antenna masts.

Updated 29 December 2022

Tallest demolished buildings

This includes spires and architectural details but does not include antenna masts.

Timeline of tallest buildings
This list ranks the tallest storied buildings in the UK throughout history, excluding free standing clock towers, church spires and other such structures.

Tallest buildings by city

Cities with tallest buildings

Cities with buildings >100m 

List measures buildings by architectural height

Updated 11 February 2023

Cities with buildings >100m (Under Construction) 

List measures buildings by architectural height

Updated 30 January 2023

See also
 List of tallest structures in the United Kingdom
 List of tallest buildings and structures in the United Kingdom by usage

Notes

References